Entephria infidaria is a moth of the family Geometridae.

Etymology
The species name infidaria derives from the Latin infidus, meaning uncertain, unreliable, because of the great similarity with two other species (Entephria caesiata and Entephria flavicinctata).

Distribution
This species can be found in the mountainous areas of Europe (Austria, Czech Republic, France, Italy, Poland, Romania, Slovenia	and Switzerland).

This species is very similar to Entephria caesiata and Entephria flavicinctata.

Description
The forewing ground colour is ash grey, with a large wavy brown middle band. The deep sinus of the inner edge of the middle band is very characteristic. Also the first grey band is very wide, with a small brown band. The hindwings are pale white.

Biology
Entephria infidaria is usually a univoltine species, with a partial 2nd generation in the southern countries. These moths are nocturnal, resting on shady rocks during the day. Adults are on wing from June to August. The polyphagous larvae feed on lower herbaceous plants and shrubs, mainly on Alchemilla vulgaris, Fagus sylvatica, Fragaria vesca, Juniperus communis, Lonicera xylosteum, Rubus fruticosus. Sedum album, Saxifraga, Vaccinium myrtillus, Salix and Geranium species.

Bibliography
De la Harpe, J. C., 1853: Faune Suisse. Lépidoptères. IV. Partie. Phalénides. 1-160 + 1 pl.

External links
 Galerie-insecte
 Lepi’net

References

Larentiini
Moths of Europe